Sticta brevior is a species of foliose lichen in the family Peltigeraceae. It is found in the Colombian Andes.

Taxonomy

The lichen was formally described as a new species in by lichenologists Bibiana Moncada and Robert Lücking.

In a time-calibrated chronogram of the phylogeny of the genus Sticta, Sticta brevior was most closely related to S. isidokunthii and a clade containing S. impressula, S. galowayana, and S. phyllidokunthii. Sticta pseudoimpressula, described as new to science from Bolivia in 2022, is also closely related.

Habitat and distribution

It is predominantly found in the Cordillera Central and the Cordillera Occidental regions, spanning sub-andine, andine, and páramo regions. While it usually grows as an epiphyte, it may occasionally grow on the ground, often in close proximity to liverworts of the family Lejeuneaceae, and the genera Frullania and Jubula, as well as Sphagnum mosses. Additionally, it has been observed growing near the ground on Blechnum ferns.

References

brevior
Lichen species
Lichens described in 2013
Lichens of Colombia
Taxa named by Robert Lücking